The Shadow ministry of Annastatcia Palaszczuk is the Labor opposition between March 2012 and February 2015, opposing the Newman government in the Parliament of Queensland. It was led by Annastacia Palaszczuk following her election as leader of the party and Opposition Leader on 28 March 2012. Tim Mulherin was the deputy party leader and Deputy Leader of the Opposition.

Following Labor's disastrous result at the 2012 state election,  deputy party leader Leader Andrew Fraser lost his seat and Anna Bligh resigning as party leader. The Palaszczuk shadow ministry then succeeded the Bligh ministry as the Labor Party frontbench. Following Labor's victory at the 2015 state election, the shadow ministry transitioned into the First Palaszczuk Ministry. The Springborg shadow ministry then succeeded the Palaszczuk shadow ministry as the new shadow cabinet of Queensland.

Initial arrangement
The initial Shadow Ministry was announced on 19 April 2012, and changes were announced 10 days later to reflect the election of Jackie Trad at the South Brisbane by-election.

Final arrangement
On February 22, 2014, Yvette D'Ath won the ALP's eighth seat at the Redcliffe by-election and she was given a place in the Shadow Ministry. On July 18, 2014, Anthony Lynham won the ALP's ninth seat at the Stafford by-election and eventually given a place in the Shadow Ministry.

See also 
 First Palaszczuk Ministry
 Bligh Ministry
 Opposition (Queensland)
 Newman Ministry

References

External links
 Office of the Queensland Opposition

Politics of Queensland
Palaszczuk